Chazy is a hamlet and census-designated place (CDP) in the town of Chazy, Clinton County, New York, United States. The population was 565 at the 2010 census, out of a total town population of 4,284.

Geography
U.S. Route 9 passes through the center of the hamlet, leading south  to Plattsburgh, the county seat, and north  to the Canada–US border. New York State Route 191 runs west from Chazy  to Exit 41 of Interstate 87, which leads south  to Albany, New York's state capital, and north (via Quebec Autoroute 15)  to Montreal.

Demographics

References

Census-designated places in New York (state)
Hamlets in New York (state)
Census-designated places in Clinton County, New York
Hamlets in Clinton County, New York